Michael Davison may refer to:

 Michael S. Davison (1917–2006), American general
 Michael S. Davison Jr. (born 1941), American lieutenant general
 Mike Davison (born 1950), Canadian politician
 Mike Davison (baseball) (1945–2013), American baseball player

See also
 Michael Davidson (disambiguation)